Efird's Department Store, also known as Lourie's Department Store, is a historic department store building located at Columbia, South Carolina. It was built about 1870, and is a rectangular brick building renovated and expanded in 1919. This included the addition of a third story and the installation of a new brick façade and store entrances. Between 1919 and 1958, it housed the Columbia branch of the Charlotte, North Carolina based Efird's Department Store chain. It currently houses a Mast General Store, which moved in on May 25, 2011.

It was added to the National Register of Historic Places in 2012.

References

Defunct department stores based in South Carolina
Commercial buildings on the National Register of Historic Places in South Carolina
Commercial buildings completed in 1919
Buildings and structures in Columbia, South Carolina
National Register of Historic Places in Columbia, South Carolina
Commercial buildings completed in 1870